Birōjima is a small (8 ha in area and 75 m in height) uninhabited island lying off the coast of Miyazaki Prefecture, Kyushu, Japan. It has been recognised as an Important Bird Area (IBA) by BirdLife International because it supports a population of Pleske's grasshopper warblers as well as a breeding colony of Japanese murrelets.

References

 
Important Bird Areas of Japan
Seabird colonies
Islands of Miyazaki Prefecture